Pamelah (パメラ Pamera) were a Japanese electro-power-pop band formed in 1995 by vocalist and lyricist, Yuki Mizuhara and composer and guitarist, Masazumi Ozawa.  The band's name was created by Daiko Nagato and comes from actresses name, Pamela Tiffin who was popular mainly in the 1960s. Pamelah disbanded in 2000.

Biography
Before band formation, Masazumi has already been active as an arranger. His first work was included in Wands's debut single Sabishisa wa Aki no Iro in b-side track Stray Cat". Yuki has been educated with various vocal lessons since 1992 until debut.

On February 1995, Pamelah debuted with their single Looking for the Truth. The song was written by Mariko Kurosawa. Since then, all their music was self-produced.

In 1996, after releasing their second studio album Pure, they were rewarded with a Japanese Gold Disc in Best 5 New Artist nominations. The album ranked No.3 in Oricon Weekly Charts and sold over more than 200,000 copies.

As one of the rare Being Inc. artist along with Manish, they've made multiple media appearances on Music Station.

In 1997, their single Spirit was used as a third ending theme for the anime television series Hell Teacher Nūbē. It became their most successful single, reached in Oricon Weekly Charts with rank 15.

In 1998, their official website was launched alongside their fan club.

In 1999 March they held their first video chat with fans. After releasing their final studio album Ism in September, they disbanded without announcement.

In 2000, Yuki started her solo career by releasing single Love is pain, however soon after release, she stopped appearing in public and her music is no longer sold anywhere. Masazumi continues to provide arrangements and guitar assistance to many Giza Studio artists such as Aiko Kitahara or U-ka Saegusa in dB.

In 2003, during the release of complete at the being studio compilation album series, the album includes two previously unreleased songs: Yuki's solo single and Aimai which were both exclusively released only for this album.

Some of their music videos were released in 2012 in the 2-disc DVD set Legend of 90's J-Rock Best Live & Clips.

In 2016, Masazumi appeared as a guest musician during Zard live tour Zard What a beautiful memory: Forever Best 25. Yuki has not appeared publicly since 2000.

Members
Yuki Mizuhara (水原 由貴)- vocalist, lyricist
Masazumi Ozawa (小澤 正澄)- keyboardist, composer, arranger, programmator

Discography
During their career they released five studio albums, three compilation albums, and one remix album, alongside fourteen singles.

Studio albumsTruth (1995)Pure (1996)Spirit (1997)Hearts (1998)Ism (1999)

Compilation albumsPamelah Hit Collection: Confidence (1997)complete "Pamelah" at the Being Studio (2003)Best of Best 1000 Pamelah (2007)

SinglesLooking for the truth (1995)I Feel Down (1995)Kirei ni nanka Aisenai (1995)I shall be released (1996)Blind Love (1996)Namida (1996)Spirit (1997)Itoshii Kimi (1997)Confidence (1997)Two of hearts (1998)Kizuna (1998)Kioku (1999)Yurusarenai Koi (1999)Individualism (1999)

Japan Gold Disc Award Certifications
1996: Best 5 New Coming Artist

In-media usage
Looking for the truth was used as an ending theme for TV Asahi news program Ongaku News NO.I Feel Down was used as an opening theme for TV Asahi music program Ongaku News HOKirei ni Nanka Aisenai was used as a theme song for TV Asahi neo variety program PafoPafoI shall be released was used as an ending theme for TV Asahi music program Ongaku News HOBlind Love was used as an opening theme for TV Asahi sports variety program Ring no Tamashii
Namida was used as an opening theme for TV Asahi variety program Kamioka Ryuutaro no Kinin
Spirit was used as a second ending theme for Anime television series Hell Teacher Nūbē
Itoshii Kimi was used as a commercial song for Suzuki new model New Jinmy and as an ending theme for TV Asahi variety program Youkini Capucino
Confidence was used as an opening theme for TV Asahi sports variety program Ring no Tamashii
Two of hearts was used as an opening theme for TV Asahi Owarai program Owarai Koujou Iinkai Warawasero and as a commercial song for Autobacs Seven
Kizuna was used as a theme song for TV Tokyo television drama series Rosetta: The Masked Angel
Kioku was used as a theme song for TV Asahi short television drama series Aozora Mahjong
Individualism was used as an opening theme for TV Asahi information program Midnight Mermaid

Television appearances

Music Station:
Looking for the truth
I Feel Down
Kirei ni nanka Aisenai
I shall be released (guest musician: Hirohito Furui)
Blind Love
Namida
Spirit
Itoshii Kimi
Confidence
Kizuna

CDTV:
I shall be released

Utaban:
Kizuna

Magazine appearances
From Music Freak Magazine:

Vol.11: 1995/October
Vol.14: 1996/January
Vol.15: 1996/February
Vol.21: 1996/August
Vol.22: 1996/September
Vol.26: 1997/January
Vol.28: 1997/March
Vol.29: 1997/April
Vol.32: 1997/July

Vol.36: 1997/November
Vol.37: 1997/December
Vol.42: 1998/May
Vol.45: 1998/August
Vol.46: 1998/September
Vol.47: 1998/October
Vol.51: 1999/February
Vol.54: 1999/May
Vol.55: 1999/June
Vol.58: 1999/September
Vol.59: 1999/October

References

External links
Official Site
Musicbrainz
Old Official Site (WebArchived)
Being Creators Masazumi profile
Masazumi Ozawa Discography at Discogs

Being Inc. artists
Japanese pop music groups
Living people
Musical groups established in 1995
Musical groups disestablished in 2000
Year of birth missing (living people)